Coltrane is a studio album by jazz saxophonist, bandleader, and composer John Coltrane. It was recorded in April and June 1962, and released in July of that same year by Impulse! Records. At the time, it was overlooked by the music press, but has since come to be regarded as a significant recording in Coltrane's discography. When reissued on CD, it featured a Coltrane composition dedicated to his musical influence "Big Nick" Nicholas that the saxophonist recorded for his Duke Ellington collaboration Duke Ellington & John Coltrane (1963). The composition "Tunji" was written by Coltrane in dedication to the Nigerian drummer Babatunde Olatunji.

Release 
The album's original Impulse! Records release was announced in the July 21, 1962, issue of Cash Box under the banner of "July Album Releases"; Routledge's The John Coltrane Reference (2013) confirms the release date as being around August 1962. According to All About Jazz writer Mark Werlin, Coltrane was initially overlooked in the music press, and later by music historians, because of the "hostility and incomprehension" that had met the saxophonist's controversial performances alongside fellow saxophonist Eric Dolphy at the Village Vanguard in 1961 and on tour in the US and Europe: "[The album] was intentionally shadowed—at the time of its recording—by a campaign of uninformed music criticism and personal attacks on Coltrane and Dolphy published in prestigious American newspapers and the preeminent jazz magazine Down Beat."

In 2002, Impulse! reissued Coltrane as a two-CD deluxe edition with the disclaimer that it used "second-generation, compressed and equalized tapes of all tracks", except "Miles' Mode", whose original master was still in existence, along with bonus tracks mastered from original recordings. In 2016, the Verve Label Group rereleased the album in commemoration of Coltrane's 90th birthday, as a 192kHz/24bit digital download.

Critical reception and analysis 

According to Werlin, "The music of Coltrane is modal jazz, but far from the cerebral music advanced by George Russell or the comparatively restrained work by the Miles Davis Sextet on Kind of Blue." Ultimately, Werlin regards the album as a "major" work of Coltrane and his quartet. AllMusic's Michael G. Nastos calls the album "a most focused effort, a relatively popular session to both [Coltrane's] fans or latecomers, with five selections that are brilliantly conceived and rendered." He found Coltrane "simply masterful" on tenor saxophone with a "fully formed instrumental voice" that "shine[s] through in the most illuminating manner", and wrote of the album's standing in his catalog:

Francis Davis of The Village Voice feels that, apart from the "modal, three-quarter time novelty hit" "The Inch Worm", consumers should buy the album for "the gorgeous 'Soul Eyes' and a shattering 'Out of This World'."

Track listing 
Side One
 "Out of This World" (Harold Arlen, Johnny Mercer) – 14:06
 "Soul Eyes" (Mal Waldron) – 5:26
Side Two
 "The Inch Worm" (Frank Loesser) – 6:19
 "Tunji" (Coltrane) – 6:33
 "Miles' Mode" (Coltrane) – 7:31

 Both sides were combined as tracks 1–5 on the CD reissue.
1997 CD bonus tracks
"Big Nick" (Coltrane) – 4:04
 "Up 'Gainst The Wall" (Coltrane) – 3:13

2002 deluxe edition 
Disc One
 "Out of This World" – 14:04
 "Soul Eyes" – 5:25
 "The Inch Worm" – 6:14
 "Tunji" – 6:32
 "Miles' Mode" – 7:31

Disc Two
 "Not Yet" (Tyner) – 6:13
 "Miles' Mode" – 7:08
 "Tunji" – 10:41
 "Tunji" – 7:55
 "Tunji" – 7:16
 "Tunji" – 7:48
 "Impressions" (Coltrane) – 6:32
 "Impressions" – 4:33
 "Big Nick" – 4:28
 "Up 'Gainst the Wall" – 3:15

Personnel
 John Coltrane – tenor saxophone, soprano saxophone
 Jimmy Garrison – double bass
 Elvin Jones – drums
 McCoy Tyner – piano
Technical
Pete Turner – photography

Notes

References

External links 
 

1962 albums
John Coltrane albums
Albums produced by Bob Thiele
Impulse! Records albums
Modal jazz albums
Albums recorded at Van Gelder Studio